TGV inOui is the brand name of premium TGV train services operated by SNCF since 27 May 2017 on certain high speed rail services. SNCF is in the process of replacing 'classic' TGV services with the premium inOui and low-cost Ouigo brands in preparation for the future opening of France's high-speed rail infrastructure to competition. The name 'inOui' was adopted because it resembles the French word inouï meaning “extraordinary” (or literally, “unheard of”).

History 
In 2017, TGV inOui trains were tested on the Paris – Bordeaux – Toulouse line.

The brand was officially presented in September 2018. Its aim is to replace existing TGV services with "plus de confort, de services et de connectivité" (English: "more comfort, services and connectivity"). In December 2018, trains operated between Lille, Marseille and Nice from Paris and operated on the rest of the network from 2020.

References 

SNCF
SNCF brands
SNCF companies and subsidiaries
High-speed rail in France